Sokka is a fictional character in Nickelodeon's animated television series Avatar: The Last Airbender and its sequel series The Legend of Korra. The character, created by Michael Dante DiMartino and Bryan Konietzko, is voiced by Jack DeSena in the original series and by Chris Hardwick in the sequel series. He is a warrior of the Water Tribe and the son of Chief Hakoda and Kya. In the live-action film adaptation, he is portrayed by Jackson Rathbone, while in the forthcoming live-action television series adaptation, he will be portrayed by Ian Ousley. 

In the original series, fifteen-year-old Sokka is a warrior of the Southern Water Tribe, a nation where some people are able to telekinetically manipulate, or "bend", water. He, along with his younger sister Katara, discovers an Airbender named Aang, the long-lost Avatar, and accompanies him to defeat the imperialistic Fire Nation and bring peace to the war-torn nations. Unlike his companions, Sokka is a non-bender, but as the show progresses he masters swordplay and proves himself to be a worthy strategist. Being a non-bender, Sokka uses different weapons such as his boomerang and machete; and eventually a jian sword to combat enemies.

Conception and creation
In the Avatar Nick Mag Presents: First Edition issue by co-creators Michael Dante DiMartino and Bryan Konietzko, stated that Sokka was originally designed as a minor figure; but when his comedian voice actor Jack DeSena brought liveliness to his character, they began to emphasize this quality.

As a result of his design, Sokka's character is a source of comic relief throughout the series, often a victim of visual comedy. Among various running gags involving Sokka are his immersion in viscous substances, such as raw sewage, slurry, phlegm, or saliva; and forgetting that Toph is blind. Sokka also has a tendency to produce or at times laugh at jokes shared by no other character.

In "Tales of Ba Sing Se", Sokka's name was written as 索卡, whereof Sǔo (索) means to search, demand, ask, exact, or isolated and Kǎ (卡) means to check, block, or card. The character for Kǎ also appears in Katara's name.

Personality
According to his sister Katara, Sokka was initially skeptical, abrasive, sexist and immature but was always sharp-witted. Incapable of bending abilities himself, Sokka instead pursues martial arts, sciences, and engineering. He is intelligent, resourceful and at times he even proves to be quite scholarly. However, he is often clumsy and sometimes mistaken. Despite his flaws, he is loving, brotherly, and protective. He holds little interest in the mysticism of bending and prefers to rely on his strength and wits. He tends to be rash, and his arrogance often leads to embarrassment, as during a haiku contest when, in his last verse of his song, he included too many syllables. Even though Sokka finds himself victim to embarrassment, he has the capability to apologize and seek resolution to avoid preceding moments of embarrassment from recurring. This capability is evident from his sincere apology to the Kyoshi Warriors for his chauvinistic opinions in the fourth episode of Book One.

As an advocate of human carnivorism, Sokka is the main hunter in the group; often makes dry-witted jokes or abrasive remarks; and accordingly once describes himself as "the meat and sarcasm guy".

Under the guidance of swordsmaster Piandao, Sokka displays various unorthodox procedures when undergoing his training; such that Piandao relates that though Sokka's skills were unimpressive, he displayed much creativity, versatility, and intelligence. As a rule, most or all of the foregoing characteristics appear as sources of comic relief.

After the failure of his Fire Nation invasion plan, Sokka attempted to restore his honor by risking his life in order to rescue his father from a highly secure prison known as 'the Boiling Rock'.

Innovations and abilities
Unusual for an inhabitant of a mystical world, Sokka prefers mechanistic science and is something of a jack-of-all-trades. He seems naturally adept at creating weapons from any available material  and adapting them to various purposes, as when he used explosives to simulate Firebending or optical illusions to help his sister Katara imitate Earthbending. Alongside the Mechanist, Sokka devised a system of control for an experimental hot air balloon and partly began the design of waterbending-powered submarines. Sokka also demonstrated advanced mathematic skills and a talent for geometry towards the end of the series; but is whimsically depicted in the epilogue as a poor draughtsman.

In addition to his engineering and strategic skills, Sokka shows a remarkable talent for poetry in "The Tales of Ba Sing Se", wherein he competes with a local instructor in a haiku contest, and holds his own at length before mistakenly adding an extra syllable to the end of a haiku. Sokka writes with his right hand, but draws with his left hand, and may therefore be accounted ambidextrous.

As the only non-bender in Aang's group, Sokka is often overshadowed by the bending skills of his friends; but his skill in martial arts improves as the series progresses, and it is sometimes he who devises victorious strategy. Alongside his trademark boomerang, Sokka is shown wielding a club, a machete, a jaw blade, and eventually a black jian sword of meteoric iron capable of cutting through solid metal, identified as his "space sword". Sokka also receives a white lotus Pai Sho piece from his master, the symbol of the secret 'White Lotus' Society notable for disregarding traditional rivalries and hatreds between the nations; although most of the series' protagonists have had in-depth interactions with members of the White Lotus, Sokka is the only one to receive this implied invitation.

Appearances in other media
Sokka's character has appeared in three THQ video games for the show, which are Avatar: The Last Airbender video game, Avatar: The Last Airbender – The Burning Earth and Avatar: The Last Airbender – Into the Inferno. Like Aang, Sokka also appears on some Avatar T-shirts sold by Nick, as well as in Tokyopop's films comic (sometimes referred to as cine-manga).

Film
Sokka was played by Jackson Rathbone in the live-action adaptation The Last Airbender. His name in the film is pronounced "SOH-kuh". Unlike the show, this version of Sokka has a serious demeanor, with most of his immature and humorous qualities either toned down or removed entirely. Significant criticism was pointed at the character difference. Rathbone received the Golden Raspberry Award for Worst Supporting Actor for his role in the film.

Family tree

References

External links

Sokka at Nick.com

Television characters introduced in 2005
Animated characters introduced in 2005
Avatar: The Last Airbender characters
Animated human characters
Dark Horse Comics characters
Fictional aboriginal people in the Polar regions
Fictional blade and dart throwers
Fictional diplomats
Fictional inventors
Fictional tribal chiefs
Fictional jianke
Fictional Baguazhang practitioners
Fictional tai chi practitioners
Fictional child soldiers
Fictional military strategists
Fictional swordfighters
Fictional war veterans
Male characters in animated series
Teenage characters in television
Fictional ranged weapons practitioners
Child superheroes
Teenage superheroes
es:Anexo:Personajes de Avatar: la leyenda de Aang#Sokka